During the 2011–12 season, the football team representing Zamalek Sporting Club of Giza, Egypt were eliminated in the eighth round of the 2012 CAF Champions League. The domestic competitions they entered, the Egyptian Premier League and the Egypt Cup, were abandoned following the Port Said Stadium disaster of 1 February 2012.

Squad

Out on loan

Friendlies

Mid-season friendlies

League table 

Zamalek SC seasons
Zamalek